A vertical service code (VSC) is a sequence of digits and the signals star (*) and number sign (#) dialed on a telephone keypad or rotary dial to enable or disable certain telephone service features. Some vertical service codes require dialing of a telephone number after the code sequence. On a touch tone telephone, the codes are usually initiated with the star key, resulting in the commonly used name star codes. On rotary dial telephones, the star is replaced by dialing 11.

In North American telephony, VSCs were developed by AT&T Corp. as Custom Local Area Signaling Services (CLASS or LASS) codes in the 1960s and 70s. Their use became ubiquitous throughout the 1990s and eventually became a recognized standard. As CLASS was an AT&T trademark, the term vertical service code was adopted by the North American Numbering Plan Administration. The use of vertical is a somewhat dated reference to older switching methods and the fact that these services can only be accessed by a local telephone subscriber, going up (vertically) inside the local central office instead of out (horizontally) to another telephone company.

Feature definitions

North America & elsewhere
The following are the vertical service codes generally recommended by the North American Numbering Plan Administration for use in the NANP territories. Not all of these services are available in all areas, and some are only available to landline or cellular telephones.

Local Area Signalling Services (LASS) and Custom Calling Feature Control Codes:

See also 
 Mobile dial code
 Pat Fleet – Prompt voice for most U.S. AT&T implementations of VSC features
 Public switched telephone network
 Short code
 Signalling System 7

References

External links
 ETSI Supplementary service codes

Calling features
North American Numbering Plan
Telephone numbers in Canada

de:Vermittlungstechnische Leistungsmerkmale (öffentliche Netze)